Erdem Özgenç (born 22 August 1984) is a Turkish footballer who plays as a right back for Pendikspor. He made his Süper Lig debut on 11 September 2011. Throughout his career, he has made 333 appearances and scored 23 goals.

References

External links
 
 
 Erdem Özgenç at eurosport.com
 

1984 births
People from Hendek
Living people
Turkish footballers
Association football fullbacks
Association football defenders
Maltepespor footballers
Turanspor footballers
Kartalspor footballers
Boluspor footballers
Kardemir Karabükspor footballers
Bursaspor footballers
MKE Ankaragücü footballers
Gençlerbirliği S.K. footballers
Fatih Karagümrük S.K. footballers
Tuzlaspor players
Pendikspor footballers
Süper Lig players
TFF First League players